The League of Ireland XI, more recently referred to as the Airtricity League XI for sponsorship reasons, is the representative team of the League of Ireland, the national association football league of the Republic of Ireland. For much of its history, the League of Ireland XI has effectively acted as a reserve or B team to the senior Republic of Ireland national team, providing international representative honours to home-based players. In fact it has played considerably more games than the actual Republic of Ireland B national football team. In addition to playing regular games against similar representative teams, such as the Irish League XI, the Scottish Football League XI and the Football League XI, the League of Ireland XI has also played in prestige friendlies against the full national teams of both Argentina and Brazil. The League of Ireland XI also represented Ireland in the qualifying stages of the 1988 Olympic Football Tournament. More recently a League of Ireland U-23 XI has represented the Republic of Ireland in the International Challenge Trophy. Meanwhile, a senior team with no age or nationality restriction regularly plays visiting club sides. More recently the team competed in the 2011 Dublin Super Cup

History

1920s and 1930s
During the 1920s and 1930s, the four national associations that made up the International Football Association Board (IFAB)– The Football Association, the Scottish Football Association, the Football Association of Wales and Northern Ireland's Irish Football Association – refused to recognise the rights of the Football Association of Ireland (FAI) when it came arranging full internationals. Consequently, the FAI could not arrange full internationals against its nearest neighbours. The IFAB, however, did permit inter-league games to be played. In the absence of full internationals against England, Scotland, Wales or Northern Ireland, these inter-league matches between the League of Ireland XI, the Irish League XI, the Welsh Football League XI and the Scottish Football League XI were highly regarded by both the FAI and Irish football fans alike. Attendances of up to 30,000 at these matches at Dalymount Park led them to have been treated almost as full internationals.

The League of Ireland XI made their official debut with a 3–3 draw against a Welsh Football League XI on 9 February 1924. Ernie MacKay scored the representative team's first ever goal while Dave Roberts added the other two. The League of Ireland XI played the Irish League XI for the first time on 13 March 1926. Charlie Dowdall scored twice in a 3–1 win for the home team. On St. Patrick's Day, 1937, a League of Ireland XI also played and defeated visiting Yugoslav side SK Jugoslavija 3–2. The League of Ireland XI played the Scottish League XI for the first time on St. Patrick's Day, 1939. The Scottish team was billed as a team of all-stars and had a combined valuation estimated to be £60,000. In front of a crowd of 35,000 at Dalymount Park, the League of Ireland XI defeated the Scottish League XI with Johnny Johnstone and Paddy Bradshaw scoring the goals in the 2–1 win

National Team
The League of Ireland XI has always enjoyed a close relationship with the senior Republic of Ireland national team. When Ireland competed at both the 1924 and 1948 Olympic Football Tournaments, they were represented by League of Ireland XIs made up of amateur players. On at least three further occasions before the Second World War, the FAI selected a full international team entirely made up of players playing in Ireland. On 21 March 1926, for the game against Italy, the Ireland team even featured Drumcondra’s Joe Grace from the Leinster Senior League. It was a League of Ireland XI that played Belgium on 12 February 1928 and then the Netherlands on 8 December 1935. Before the Second World War, League of Ireland players made up the nucleus of just about every FAI Ireland full international team.

Post-Second World War
For most of the Second World War era, the League of Ireland XI's only opponents were the Irish League XI. However once the conflict ended, the fixture against the Scottish League XI was revived. They also began to play the Football League XI on a regular basis. With the majority of the leading Irish players now playing in the Football League, however, the League of Ireland XI now found itself at a disadvantage. As a result, the majority of the games they played against the Scottish League XI and the Football League XI usually ended in heavy defeat. However, there was the occasional success story. On 2 October 1963 at Dalymount Park, the League of Ireland XI defeated the Football League XI 2–1, thanks to goals from Eddie Bailham and Ronnie Whelan. This Football League XI included four players – Ray Wilson, Bobby Moore, Roger Hunt and Martin Peters – who subsequently went on to help England win the 1966 FIFA World Cup. At the time Whelan was working for Unidaire, a Finglas-based electrical firm, and he subsequently received a warning from his boss at the company for taking time off to play in this game.

Prestige Friendlies
From the late 1970s onwards, the League of Ireland XI also began to play friendlies against national teams. These included two prestige games against the full Argentina national team. On 19 April 1978, at the Estadio Alberto J. Armando, Argentina played the League of Ireland XI in a warm up game as part of their preparations for hosting the 1978 FIFA World Cup. A team that included the former England international Bobby Tambling and several Republic of Ireland internationals such as Johnny Giles, Ray Treacy, Eamonn Gregg, Noel Synnott, Cathal Muckian, Jerome Clark and Synan Braddish lost 3–1 to a very strong Argentina. The starting eleven for Argentina included ten players who later played in the 1978 FIFA World Cup Final. In addition a young Diego Maradona also came on as a substitute. Leopoldo Luque, Oscar Ortiz and Ricardo Villa scored for Argentina before Synan Braddish grabbed a consolation goal for the league select. On 29 May 1979, Argentina, then the reigning World Cup holders, visited Lansdowne Road  and were held to a 0–0 draw by a Republic of Ireland XI in a UNICEF fundraiser; this team is sometimes incorrectly listed as a League of Ireland XI.
30 April 1980 saw the League of Ireland XI play Argentina for a second time, this time at the Estadio Monumental. On this occasion, a team that included Liam Buckley, Terry Eviston, Johnny Walsh and Tommy McConville lost 1–0 to a goal scored by Diego Maradona. A month later, Argentina beat the senior Republic of Ireland 1–0 at Lansdowne Road.

In another notable game from this era, the League of Ireland XI also became the first representative team to play the Basque Country following the ending of the Francoist regime. This game was played on 16 August 1979 at the San Mamés Stadium. The Basque team was made up of Real Sociedad and Athletic Bilbao players and all eleven subsequently became full Spain internationals. In contrast the league select was under strength and was referred to in newspaper reports as a League of Ireland B team. The Basque Country team easily defeated this League of Ireland XI 4–1. In 1981, the League of Ireland XI returned to South America and this time played Brazil. A team managed by Jim McLaughlin lost 6–0 with the legendary Zico scoring four of Brazil's goals.

Olympic qualifiers

League of Ireland XIs made up of amateur players represented Ireland in qualifiers for the 1960, 1972, 1976 and 1980 Olympic Football Tournaments. For the 1988 Olympic Football Tournament qualifiers, a senior League of Ireland XI featuring professionals represented Ireland. They were drawn in a "group of death" that also included Hungary, Sweden, Spain and France – France had won the gold medal at the 1984 Olympic Football Tournament. This League of Ireland XI was again managed by Jim McLaughlin.

The team kicked off their Olympic campaign with a 2–1 defeat against Hungary at Glenmalure Park on November 11, 1986. Their next opponents were Spain at Tolka Park on February 4, 1987. Goals from Noel Larkin and Mick Byrne saw the League of Ireland XI draw 2–2. Their first away games came against Sweden and France. The League of Ireland XI lost 1–0 to Sweden after they conceded a very late goal but managed to hold France to a 1–1 draw. On August 26, 1987, a crowd of less than 1,000 saw the League of Ireland XI lose 1–0 at Dalymount Park to a Sweden team that included Thomas Brolin. Next came the home match against France on 18 November 1987 at Dalymount Park. A crowd of just 4,000 would witness one of the League of Ireland XI's best results. Two goals from Mick Bennett and one from Peter Eccles saw them gain a 3–0 win. Ireland finished the qualifying group with two away games. Dave Barry scored in Hungary but the League of Ireland XI lost 3–1 while goals from Barry Kehoe and Bennett earned them a 2–2 with Spain in Alicante. The League of Ireland XI finished fourth in the group. Sweden qualified for the finals where they were knocked out in the quarter-finals.

Group C Final Table

1988 Marlboro Cup
In August 1988, the League of Ireland XI competed in the Marlboro Cup, a four team tournament, held at the Los Angeles Memorial Coliseum. They lost their first game 3–0 against Club Universidad de Guadalajara on 5 August, with Mick Neville conceding an own goal. They then lost 1–0 to El Salvador in a third place playoff two days later. The tournament was won by Guatemala, who beat Club Universidad 3–2 in the final.

Aviva Stadium

Manchester United
On 4 August 2010, the League of Ireland XI hosted the first soccer match to be played at the Aviva Stadium. A team managed by Damien Richardson lost 7–1 to Manchester United. The league select were 6-0 down after 70 minutes, with goals from Park Ji-sung (2), Michael Owen, Javier Hernández, Antonio Valencia and Jonny Evans. Park opened the scoring in the 13th minute in bizarre fashion; as he went to block a defender's clearance, the ball ricocheted off him and into the net. Owen doubled United's lead in the 25th minute with a chipped shot over the goalkeeper, before half-time substitute Hernández made it 3–0 two minutes after the break. Three goals in the space of nine minutes from Valencia (60th minute), a second from Park (63rd) and Jonny Evans (69th) increased the lead to 6–0, before Dave Mulcahy scored a consolation goal for the League of Ireland XI in the 78th minute. Nevertheless, there was still time for Nani to get a seventh goal, converting a penalty after Hernández had been fouled in the penalty area.

Dublin Super Cup
Damien Richardson was again in charge of the League of Ireland XI when the Aviva Stadium hosted the 2011 Dublin Super Cup, a tournament which saw the representative team take on both Manchester City and Celtic. Shamrock Rovers players, however, were not available because of a clash with the 2011–12 UEFA Champions League qualifying phase and play-off rounds. As a result, Richardson had to field an understrength team. They lost their opening game to Manchester City 3–0, then lost 5–0 to Celtic. The League of Ireland XI were the only team in the tournament that didn't win a match or score any goals.

League of Ireland XI matches

Recent squad
The following players were called up for the 2011 Dublin Super Cup

|-
! colspan="10"  style="background:#b0d3fb; text-align:left;"|
|- style="background:#dfedfd;"

|-
! colspan="10"  style="background:#b0d3fb; text-align:left;"|
|- style="background:#dfedfd;"

|-
! colspan="9"  style="background:#b0d3fb; text-align:left;"|
|- style="background:#dfedfd;"

|}

Non-Irish players
Throughout the history of the League of Ireland, the vast majority of the players have come from either the Republic of Ireland or Northern Ireland. Consequently, the League of Ireland XI has largely been made up of Irish players. However, there has always been a contingent of non-Irish players and, right from the beginning, they have been selected to play for the League of Ireland XI. Dave Roberts from England scored twice in the team's very first game. Another English-born player, Johnny Matthews, scored a penalty against Gordon Banks when the League of Ireland XI played the Football League XI in 1971 at Lansdowne Road. Like Roberts and Matthews, most of the non-Irish players have come from Great Britain but some have come from further afield.

References

 
XI
Representative teams of association football leagues
1924 establishments in Ireland
Sports organizations established in 1924